Cripps is a surname of English origin, and may refer to:

 Andrew Cripps, Australian politician 
 Annabelle Cripps, competitive swimmer
 Arthur Shearly Cripps (1869–1952), Anglican priest and writer
 Charles Cripps, 1st Baron Parmoor (1852–1941), British politician
 Colin Cripps, musician
 David Cripps, musician
 Godfrey Cripps (1865–1943), cricketer
 Harry Cripps (1941–1995), footballer
 Humphrey Cripps (1915–2000), British businessman and philanthropist
 Dame Isobel Cripps (1891–1979), British overseas aid organizer
 Jamie Cripps, footballer
 Jason Cripps, footballer
 Jeff Cripps, musical producer
 John Cripps (horticulturalist), British–Australian horticulturalist
 John Cripps (journalist), British journalist
 Mick Cripps, musician
 Patrick Cripps, footballer
 Peggy Cripps (1921–2006), children's author
 Sarah Cripps
 Sir Stafford Cripps, British politician (1889–1952)
 William Cripps (d. 1848), British politician
 William Joseph Cripps (1841–1903), British writer on antique silver plate

See also
 Crips, American gang, founded in Los Angeles